These lists of television programs with LGBT characters include:

Characters
 List of bisexual characters in television
 List of gay characters in television
 List of lesbian characters in television
 List of transgender characters in television
 List of LGBT characters in radio and podcasts
 List of LGBT characters in soap operas

Episodes
 List of 1970s American television episodes with LGBT themes
 List of 1980s American television episodes with LGBT themes
 List of 1990s American television episodes with LGBT themes
 Lists of American television episodes with LGBT themes
 
 
 
 
 List of pre–Stonewall riots American television episodes with LGBT themes

Series
 
 
 
 
 List of animated series with LGBTQ+ characters
 List of comedy television series with LGBT characters
 List of dramatic television series with LGBT characters: 1960s–2000s
 List of dramatic television series with LGBT characters: 2010–2015
 List of dramatic television series with LGBT characters: 2016–2019
 List of dramatic television series with LGBT characters: 2020s
 List of horror television series with LGBT characters
 List of television series with bisexual characters

Miscellaneous
 List of news and information television programs featuring LGBT subjects
 List of fictional bisexual characters
 List of fictional lesbian characters
 List of fictional gay characters
 List of fictional asexual characters
 List of fictional non-binary characters
 List of fictional pansexual characters
 List of made-for-television films with LGBT characters

Cast
 List of comedy and variety television programs with LGBT cast members
 List of reality television programs with LGBT cast members

See also

 Television works about intersex

Further reading

Lists of character lists
Lists of entertainment lists
Lists of LGBT-related television shows
Television programs